KP Naveen (born 10 September 1981) is a Music director and percussionist in the Telugu film industry. He plays rhythm pad in television shows and has performed in various live shows along with legendary singers. He is also a sound engineer and an actor. He has acted in the television soap Sri Sai Manasa Vasistyam, which was telecasted in a regional Telugu channel. From 2006 to 2015, he assisted popular Telugu music director MM. Srilekha, who is the only female music director in the Indian film industry and has her name in the limca book of records. He is the MUSIC DIRECTOR of a Hindi movie- Do Nawabs Hyderabad Kay.

Life 
Naveen is the second son of K Lingaiah and Balanarsamma, based in Dubbak of Telangana district. He later moved to Hyderabad and started his career as a rhythm pad player at the age of 18. He is the student of percussionist Sri. Nagarajan, popular as Nagi in Chennai film industry, and Sri. Madhusudan, also a percussionist in the Telugu film industry.

Albums 
 Shailaja {http://play.raaga.com/telugu/music/KP.-Naveen}

Movies 
 Do Nawabs Hyderabad Kay {https://www.youtube.com/watch?v=Py6vIuB7AT4 As music director}
 Mr. Item 
 Bad boys
 Badichowdi
 Romi - The hero

References (Links) 

http://www.raaga.com/channels/hindi/music/KP._Naveen.html
http://play.raaga.com/hindi/music/KP.-Naveen
http://www.raaga.com/channels/telugu/music/KP._Naveen.html

https://www.youtube.com/watch?v=RCqJ4-I6JTc
https://www.youtube.com/watch?v=mhRywj6tgh8
http://www.hungama.com/artists/k-p-navveen/4754522

Indian percussionists
Indian filmmakers
1981 births
Living people